The SJFA West Region League Two (also known as the McBookie.com West of Scotland League Two) is a Scottish semi-professional football competition run by the West Region of the Scottish Junior Football Association and is the fourth tier of league competition for its member clubs. The league was created when West Region clubs voted in 2017 to organise all leagues on a regionwide basis, with the Central First and Second Divisions and the Ayrshire Division merging and their teams separated into two tiers. Clubs will be promoted to a new regionwide League One.

The competition was abolished in 2020 when all SJFA West Region clubs moved to join the newly-formed senior West of Scotland Football League.

Final member clubs for the 2019–20 season

Season summaries

References

2
2018 establishments in Scotland
Sports leagues established in 2018
2020 disestablishments in Scotland
Sports leagues disestablished in 2020
Defunct football leagues in Scotland
Defunct Scottish Junior Football Association leagues